Ballynoe is a  settlement and townland south of Downpatrick in County Down, Northern Ireland. It is situated in the civil parish of Bright and historic barony of Lecale Upper.

Archaeology
The main feature in the hamlet is Ballynoe stone circle, a late Neolithic to early Bronze age large circle of over fifty closely spaced upright stones, surrounding a mound which, when excavated, was found to contain two cists in which cremated bones were found. The site is near the disused railway station, reached by a long footpath off the main road, at grid ref: J481404.

Transport
Ballynoe railway station, on the Belfast and County Down Railway, opened on 8 July 1892, but finally closed on 16 January 1950.

See also 
List of townlands in County Down

References

Townlands of County Down
Civil parish of Bright